Vishpala is a woman (alternatively, a horse) mentioned in the  Rigveda (RV 1.112.10, 116.15, 117.11, 118.8 and RV 10.39.8). The name is likely from  "settlement, village" and  "strong", meaning something like "protecting the settlement" or "strong settlement".

Vishpala is helped in battle (alternative, in the prize-race) by the  Ashvins. As she lost her leg  "in the time of night, in Khela's battle" (alternatively, "in Khela's race, eager for a decision"), they gave her a "leg of iron" so that she could keep  running (1.116.15).

The interpretation as a female warrior in battle is due to Griffith (in keeping with Sayana), the interpretation as a horse race is due to Karl Friedrich Geldner.

As is often the case in the Rigveda, especially in the young books 1 and 10 (dated to roughly 1200 BC) a myth is only alluded to, the poet taking for granted his audience's being familiar with it, and beyond the fact that the Ashvins gave Vishpala a new leg, no information has survived, neither about Vishpala herself nor about "Khela's battle", or indeed the character of Khela (the name meaning "shaking, trembling").

A book about Vishpala has been authored by Saiswaroopa Iyer.

See also
Woman warrior
List of women warriors in folklore

References

Year of birth unknown
Year of death unknown
Indian amputees
Indian women in war
Horses in Hinduism
Prosthetics
Rigveda
Women in ancient warfare
Ancient Indian women